This is a list of schools in the Roman Catholic Diocese of Austin.

K-12 schools
 Bishop Louis Reicher Catholic School, Waco
 St. Joseph Catholic High School, Bryan
 St. Mary's Catholic School, Taylor

High schools

 Holy Trinity Catholic High School, Temple
 St. Michael's Catholic Academy, Austin
 San Juan Diego Catholic High School, Austin
 St. Dominic Savio Catholic High School, Austin
 St. Mary's Catholic School, Taylor

Grade schools
 Cathedral School of Saint Mary (Austin)
 Holy Family Catholic School (Austin)
 Sacred Heart Catholic School (LaGrange)
 Santa Cruz Catholic School (Buda)
 St. Austin Catholic School (Austin)
 St. Gabriel's Catholic School (Austin)
 St. Helen Catholic School (Georgetown)
 St. Ignatius Martyr Catholic School (Austin) - It was established on August 15, 1940 with its opening on September 15 of that year. Its first enrollment consisted of 65 children. Initially classes were held in the basement. The permanent school building, with a capacity of 450 students, opened in 1954.
 St. Joseph Catholic Elementary School (Bryan)
 St. Joseph Catholic School (Killeen)
 St. Louis Catholic School (Austin)
 St. Mary's Catholic School (Taylor)
 St. Mary's Catholic School (Temple)
 St. Mary's Catholic School (West)
 St. Theresa's Catholic School (Austin)

References

External links
 Schools of the Austin Diocese

Austin
Education in Austin, Texas